Lucien-Antoine Lagier (4 October 1814 – 28 February 1874) was a Canadian priest, Oblate of Mary Immaculate, and preacher.

References

1814 births
1874 deaths
19th-century Canadian Roman Catholic priests
People from Hautes-Alpes
Missionary Oblates of Mary Immaculate